Ikar can refer to:
 Ikar (airline), a Russian leisure airline formerly branded Pegas Fly
 Ikar (rocket stage), used as the upper stage for Soyuz-Ikar
 IKAR (Jewish congregation), a post-denominational Jewish congregation and community